YNaija is a Nigerian online content publishing platform, founded by Chude Jideonwo and Adebola Williams of RED Africa media group. YNaija launched in May 2010 with columnists and various news sources. It offers news, original content and covers politics, business, entertainment, environment, technology, popular media, lifestyle, culture, comedy and healthy living.

In July 2012, YNaija was ranked #5 top blog in the country, by CPAfrica.

Y! 
The Y! brand also includes a television show, a radio show and a print magazine.
The magazine, Y!, is a 100–150-page monthly publication that initially began as a quarterly.

It has organised events including the #Hashtag Party in July 2011, the YNaija Black Ball, and others.

Contributors 
In addition to the Y! Frontpage columns by Ebuka Obi-Uchendu, Tolu Ogunlesi, Kathleen Ndongmo, Japheth J. Omojuwa, Ayo Sogunro and Akintunde Oyebode, there are several other contributors to the Y! Politico, SuperBlogger and 30 Days, 30 Voices series and more on the newspaper, including Abang Mercy, Subomi Plumptre and Ifeanyi Dike Jr.

Awards 
In 2012, YNaija co-founders Chude Jideonwo and Adebola Williams were included by BusinessDay, in a 40 under 40 list.

In February 2013, Jideonwo and Williams were named in Forbes''' 30 Under 30: Africa's Best Young Entrepreneurs.

Nigerian technology and lifestyle blog, CPAfrica named YNaija'' the #5 Nigerian blog of the year, in 2012.

References

External links 

Nigerian news websites
Internet properties established in 2010
Mass media in Lagos
Nigerian companies established in 2010
Mass media companies established in 2010
Online magazines published in Nigeria
Companies based in Lagos